was a  after Katei and before En'ō. This period spanned the years from November 1238 to April 1239.

Change of era
 1238 :  The era name was changed to mark an event or a number of events. The previous era ended and a new one commenced in Katei 4.

Events of the Ryakunin Era
 1238 (Ryakunin 1, 1st month): Yoritsune leaves Kamakura en route to Miyako, accompanied by Yaskutoki and the troupes of several provinces. Fujiwara no Yukimitis stays at Kamakura to preserve order in the land.
 1238 (Ryakunin 1, 2nd month): Yoritsune arrives in Miyako and begins to live in his new palace at Rokuhara.
 1238 (Ryakunin 1, 10th month): Yoritsune leaves Miyako to return to Kamakura.

Notes

References
 Nussbaum, Louis-Frédéric and Käthe Roth. (2005).  Japan encyclopedia. Cambridge: Harvard University Press. ;  OCLC 58053128
 Titsingh, Isaac. (1834). Nihon Odai Ichiran; ou,  Annales des empereurs du Japon.  Paris: Royal Asiatic Society, Oriental Translation Fund of Great Britain and Ireland. OCLC 5850691
 Varley, H. Paul. (1980). A Chronicle of Gods and Sovereigns: Jinnō Shōtōki of Kitabatake Chikafusa. New York: Columbia University Press. ;  OCLC 6042764

External links
 National Diet Library, "The Japanese Calendar" -- historical overview plus illustrative images from library's collection

Japanese eras
1230s in Japan